Ignatius P. Lobo (27 April 1919 – 17 February 2010) was an Indian prelate of the Catholic Church. As of 2009, he was one of oldest Roman Catholic Bishops from India.

Lobo was born in Siolim, India and ordained priest 21 December 1947. He was appointed bishop of the Diocese of Belgaum on 26 September 1967 and retired from same diocese on 1 December 1994.

See also
Diocese of Belgaum

References

External links
Catholic-Hierarchy

1919 births
2010 deaths
20th-century Roman Catholic bishops in India